"The Watch" is the 46th episode of the sitcom Seinfeld. It is the sixth episode of the fourth season of the series, and first aired on September 30, 1992. In a direct continuation of the previous episode, "The Wallet", George learns that his efforts at negotiation have cost him and Jerry the deal with NBC for a television pilot, and he makes a desperate bid to get it back, while Jerry tries to keep his parents from discovering that the watch Uncle Leo found in a garbage can is the one they gave Jerry as a gift, and Elaine's plan for Kramer to pose as her new boyfriend does not prove as effective as hoped.

Plot
Jerry's parents Morty and Helen Seinfeld are suspicious about Uncle Leo getting his watch repaired in a day at the same place which Jerry claims has been repairing the watch they gave him for two weeks. Jerry confronts Leo in the restaurant bathroom and negotiates to buy it from him, but they are caught by Morty. Jerry confesses to having thrown the watch away and buys his father a new wallet to replace the one that went missing at the doctor's office, secretly filling it with $400 in cash to get back at his father for insisting on paying for food and gas during the trip. Morty acts pleased with the wallet, but once Jerry is gone he throws it away because it uses velcro, which Morty abhors. Leo finds the wallet full of money in the garbage and takes it.

Kramer, posing as Elaine's boyfriend, demands that her psychiatrist, Dr. Reston, stop bullying Elaine into maintaining her unwanted sexual relationship with him. Reston uses psychiatric techniques to persuade Kramer to make an appointment with him and allow him to continue dating Elaine. While waiting outside for Kramer, Elaine meets "Crazy" Joe Davola, and flirts with him. After getting her number Joe goes in to his appointment and tells Reston about the encounter.

Susan Ross passes on to George that after he refused NBC's offer, Russell Dalrymple renounced his interest in doing a pilot with George and Jerry at all. George realizes his plan has backfired, and since it is the weekend he cannot have a meeting with Russell until Monday. He wrestles Russell's address from Susan and pays an unsolicited visit to Russell at his home. He claims that his earlier refusal was a misunderstanding and pleads to get their pilot TV show reinstated. When Russell informs him that he has already signed with another writing team, George negotiates for a price of $8,000, lower than Russell's original offer. Jerry derides him for having "held out for less money".

References

External links

Seinfeld (season 4) episodes
1992 American television episodes
Television episodes written by Larry David